Eduardo Fabini (Solís de Mataojo, 18 May 1882 – 17 May 1950) was a Uruguayan composer and musician.

Fabini, along with Alfonso Broqua, Luis Cluzeau Mortet and Vicente Ascone, was representative of the nationalist tendency that emerged in Uruguayan music in the 1910s and 1920s.

Biography

Born May 18, 1882 in the small town of Solís de Mataojo, Lavalleja, with his parents Juan Fabini and Antonia Bianchi, of Italian origin and some distinguished musicians in their family. He spent his early childhood in intimate contact with nature. Fabini is considered the highest positive value of classical music in Uruguay; having started a musical orientation in classical music forms, tones and melodies of national folk music; managed as expressions of exquisite refinement, excellent inspiration, and great musical sensitivity.

His musical knowledge began at an early age. At the age of four years, his favorite toy was the accordion. At six he admired his performances in the harmonium. At this time he began his musical studies of the violin with his older brother. He continued his studies in Montevideo, at the Conservatory "The Lyre" (from 9 to 13 years) with teachers Romeo Massi and Italo Casellas, and later with Scarabelli and Ferroni. On the advice of the teacher Perez Badia, Fabini won a scholarship in 1899 at age 17 that allowed him to travel to Europe and enter the music conservatory in Brussels, where he studied with teachers deloc and Thomson, and harmony with the teacher Brouk.

It began in the composition, performing their "Tristes" for orchestra two "Intermediate" a "arpegiano Study" for piano, and choir "Flowers of the field"; while as a performer won First Prize for Violin with Distinction, awarded by the Brussels Conservatory. Fabini was the first South American in that environment to express their native music.

He returned to Uruguay in 1903, becoming known as soloist in various presentations made at the Teatro Solís of Montevideo, which aroused admiration. After another trip to Europe, to Spain in 1905 where he remained two years, he returned to Montevideo in 1907. He participated with other national musicians in founding the Musical Conservatory of Uruguay, (1907). In 1913, he co-founded the Association of Chamber Music, numerous concerts sponsored entity that acted as interpreter.

It is from time retiring to a life of field, to reside in Solís and the Source Salus, avoiding public activity. During this period he composed "Campo", his first symphonic poem, which was first performed in public at the Teatro Albéniz in Montevideo on April 29, 1922. "Field" obtained immediately widespread recognition of his musical values, being also enshrined Buenos Aires - where he was performed in 1925 at the Teatro Colón by the Vienna Philharmonic - and soon in New York, Washington, Madrid, Barcelona, Berlin, Moscow, Valencia, Rio de Janeiro and other major music cities such as Vienna, where was performed by the Philharmonic in that city, under the baton of the great Richard Strauss.

Encouraged by this success, Fabini continued intense activity in the composition of works that evoke the sounds and atmospheres of the Uruguayan countryside; presenting soon after his other symphonic poem, entitled "The Island of ceibos". Among his works are numerous songs, school choirs, and fantasy for violin and orchestra; between one other piece of ballet on the subject of a work of Fernán Silva Valdés entitled "Mburucuyá" symphonic picture "Molga", and children's ballet "Mañana de Reyes".

In 1927, he was appointed Artistic Added at the Embassy of Uruguay in the US, can move to the city of New York where "Field" and "The Island of ceibos" were recorded in recordings made by the Philharmonic Orchestra, edited by Company Victor Records.

Fabini died in May 1950 due to a heart condition.

Several schools bear his name: the departmental school in Minas (Instituto Eduardo Fabini), the Lyceum Mataojo Solis (Cradle of Fabini) and No. 6 School Music in the city of Rivera.

Style
Román Viñoly Barreto says that "Fabini never felt the procupación innovative; He never sought to highlight technical knowledge; says his music as well, because that way it feels, and how is not in your intentions hope for a vain glory, nor seeks more reward than the silence she loves, occupies a plane striking sincerity".<ref>R. Viñoly Barreto (marzo 1937). Boletín Latino-Americano de Música. Año III, Tomo III, p. 113.</ref> Salas and Pauletto added that "Fabini is essentially a nativist, simple and modest musician".

Works

 Symphonic music 
 Poema sinfónico Campo La isla de los Ceibos Fantasía para violín y orquesta Mburucuyá, ballet
 Melga sinfónica Mañana de Reyes, ballet for children

 Choir and orchestra La patria vieja Las flores del campo El Rancho A mi Rio El Arroyo descuidadoLa Güeya, canciónEl nido Singer and piano 
 Luz mala El Tala La flores del monte Piano solo 
 Dos tristes 
 Estudio arpegiado Intermezzo 
 Scarlattina Sarandí en la corriente Atlántida Discography Eduardo Fabini y María Luisa Fabini de West. (Orfeo ULP 2765)Las cinco grandes obras sinfónicas (Ayuí / Tacuabé t/m12cd. 1998)Grabaciones Históricas de su obra Volumen 2 & 3'' (Ayuí / Tacuabé tm15-16 cd)

References

External links
 

1882 births
1950 deaths
Uruguayan people of Italian descent
People from Lavalleja Department
Uruguayan musicians
Uruguayan classical composers
Uruguayan classical violinists
Uruguayan male musicians
Male classical violinists
20th-century classical composers
Male classical composers
20th-century classical violinists
20th-century male musicians